The Junior Mance Touch is an album by jazz pianist Junior Mance which was released on the Polydor label in 1973.

Reception

The Allmusic site awarded the album 3 stars calling it "A nice approach without the schmaltz".

Track listing
 "Zabuda" (Martin Rivera) - 5:02
 "Let's Stay Together" (Al Green, Willie Mitchell, Al Jackson Jr.) - 5:37
 "Tin Tin Deo" (Chano Pozo, Gil Fuller) - 7:08 	
 "Midnight Special" (Lead Belly) - 5:22
 "I Can See Clearly Now" (Johnny Nash) - 7:02
 "Where I Come From" (Junior Mance) - 7:30
 "Something" (George Harrison) - 6:08

Personnel
Junior Mance - piano 
Martin Rivera - bass
Bruno Carr - drums
String section arranged and conducted by William Fischer

References

1973 albums
Junior Mance albums
Polydor Records albums